Ant Broads and Marshes is a  biological Site of Special Scientific Interest north-east of Norwich in Norfolk. Most of it is a Nature Conservation Review site, Grade 1, and it is part of the Broadland Ramsar and Special Protection Area, and The Broads Special Area of Conservation. Part of it is the Barton Broad nature reserve, which is managed by the Norfolk Wildlife Trust, and two areas are National Nature Reserves.

This site in the valley of the River Ant is described by Natural England as the "finest example of unpolluted valley fen in Western Europe". It has a network of dykes that support a diverse variety of aquatic plants, and its fenland invertebrate fauna is of national importance.

References

Sites of Special Scientific Interest in Norfolk
Special Protection Areas in England
Special Areas of Conservation in England
National nature reserves in England
Nature Conservation Review sites
Ramsar sites in England